Kivimägi is an Estonian toponymic surname meaning "stone mountain"; a compound of kivi ("stone") and  mägi ("mountain").

As of 1 January 2021, 105 men and 100 women have the surname Kivimägi in Estonia. Kivimägi ranks 771st for men and 932th for women in the distribution of surnames in the country. The surname Kivimägi is the commonly found in Järva County, where 5.69 per 10,000 inhabitants of the county bear the name.

Notabale people with the surname Kivimägi include:

Agu Kivimägi (born 1963), Estonian computer scientist
Roman Kivimägi (1900–1928), Estonian wrestler
Tatjana Kivimägi (née Novoseltseva; born 1984), Russian-Estonian high jumper
Toomas Kivimägi (born 1963), Estonian politician and jurist

References

Estonian-language surnames